Sexpod was an American punk rock band made up of three women from Hoboken, New Jersey: vocalist and guitarist Karyn Kuhl, bassist Alice Genese, and drummer Tia Sprocket. One reviewer identified the band with the riot grrrl movement and lesbianism, saying "they're not playing cookie-cutter punk rock for kids who think it started with Green Day." 
A critic described their appearance as "defiant women who wear their love of making heavy loud noise like a badge of honor."

The band never achieved mainstream success. They played at the Michigan Womyn's Music Festival in the 1990s. Their song Foot on the Gas was used in the film Escape from L.A.

Drummer Tia Sprocket left the band in 1998, and Karyn Kuhl left by 2004, dissolving Sexpod.

Discography

Home EP (1994)
Goddess Blues (1997)

References

All-female punk bands
Punk rock groups from New Jersey
LGBT-themed musical groups
Musical groups established in 1994
Musical groups disestablished in 2004
Musicians from Hoboken, New Jersey